Nettastoma syntresis is an eel in the family Nettastomatidae (duckbill/witch eels). It was described by David G. Smith and James Erwin Böhlke in 1981. It is a marine, deep water-dwelling eel which is known from the western central Atlantic Ocean, including the Bahamas, Cuba, and the northeastern Gulf of Mexico.

The species epithet "syntresis" means "channel" in Greek, and is treated as a noun in apposition. It refers to several channels in which the species has been found, including the Santaren, Nicholas and Northwest Providence Channels.

References

Nettastomatidae
Fish of the Caribbean
Fish described in 1981